Fritz Haller is an American slalom canoeist who competed from the early 1980s to the mid-1990s. He won four medals at the ICF Canoe Slalom World Championships with two golds (C2: 1983; mixed C2: 1981) a silver (C2 team: 1983) and a bronze (C2 team: 1985).

Most of his career he was partnered by his older brother Lecky Haller.

World Cup individual podiums

References

American male canoeists
Living people
Year of birth missing (living people)
Medalists at the ICF Canoe Slalom World Championships